Chiekh Mbeye Thiam (born 16 November 2001) Italian professional footballer who plays for Fleetwood Town, as a defender.

Career
Thiam was born in Italy and is of Senegalese descent. He signed for Northern Premier League Division One North West side Mossley at the start of the 2019–20 season having impressed during pre-season. He had previously been a youth player at Shrewsbury Town before playing men's  football for Manchester Central. In October 2019, he signed dual-registration forms with North West Counties Football League Division One South side New Mills. He then attended The Manchester College where he completed the Football Scholarship Programme, having been influenced by Carlos Mendes Gomes who had previously played football for the college and subsequently signed for Football League side Morecambe. Alongside studying at the college, he also played for North West Counties Football League side Stockport Town, where he was named Manager Player of the Season for 2019–20. During this time he was invited for a trial with National League side Stockport County and it was during one of trial games against Ipswich Town that he was spotted by the Fleetwood Town Academy Manager.

On 22 June 2021, he signed for EFL League One side Fleetwood Town on a two-year deal with the option of another year in the club's favour and immediately joined the Development Squad managed by Stephen Crainey. He made his professional debut for Fleetwood on 5 October 2021 in the 3–1 win over Barrow in the EFL Trophy.

Career statistics

References

2001 births
Living people
Mossley A.F.C. players
New Mills A.F.C. players
Stockport Town F.C. players
Fleetwood Town F.C. players
English Football League players
Northern Premier League players
North West Counties Football League players
Association football defenders
French sportspeople of Senegalese descent
French footballers